Francisco Arano Montero (born 30 September 1950) is a Mexican politician from the National Action Party. From 2000 to 2003 he served as Deputy of the LVIII Legislature of the Mexican Congress representing Veracruz.

References

1950 births
Living people
Politicians from Veracruz
People from Tierra Blanca, Veracruz
National Action Party (Mexico) politicians
21st-century Mexican politicians
Universidad Veracruzana alumni
Municipal presidents in Veracruz
20th-century Mexican politicians
Members of the Congress of Veracruz
Deputies of the LVIII Legislature of Mexico
Members of the Chamber of Deputies (Mexico) for Veracruz